Spherocobaltite or sphaerocobaltite is a cobalt carbonate mineral with chemical composition CoCO3. In its (rare) pure form, it is typically a rose-red color, but impure specimens can be shades of pink to pale brown.  It crystallizes in the trigonal crystal system.

Discovery and occurrence
Spherocobaltite was first described in 1877 for an occurrence within cobalt and nickel veins in the St. Daniel Mine of the Schneeberg District, Erzgebirge, Saxony, Germany. The name is from the Greek "sphaira", sphere, and cobalt, in reference to its typical crystal habit and composition. It occurs within hydrothermal cobalt-bearing mineral deposits as a rare phase associated with 
roselite, erythrite, annabergite and cobalt rich calcite and dolomite.

References

Further reading
Sphärocobaltit

Carbonate minerals
Cobalt minerals
Symbols of Colorado
Trigonal minerals
Minerals in space group 167